The 2001 Dodge/Save Mart 350 was the 16th stock car race of the 2001 NASCAR Winston Cup Series and the 13th iteration of the event. The race was held on Sunday, June 24, 2001, in Sonoma, California, at the club layout in Sears Point Raceway, a  permanent road course layout. The race took the scheduled 112 laps to complete. In the final stages of the race, Tony Stewart, driving for Joe Gibbs Racing, would take an advantage of an angry Robby Gordon, who was focused on lapping Kevin Harvick, and slip by to win his 11th career NASCAR Winston Cup Series win and his second of the season. Robby Gordon, who was driving for Ultra Motorsports, would earn a second-place finish. To fill out the podium, Jeff Gordon, driving for Hendrick Motorsports, would finish third.

Background 

Infineon Raceway is one of two road courses to hold NASCAR races, the other being Watkins Glen International. The Chute was only used for NASCAR events such as this race, and was criticized by many drivers, who preferred the full layout.

Entry list 

 (R) denotes rookie driver.

Practice

First practice 
The first practice session was held on Friday, June 22, at 10:30 AM PST. The session would last for two hours and 30 minutes.

Second practice 
The second practice session was held on Saturday, June 22, at 9:30 AM PST. The session would last for one hour and 30 minutes.

Third and final practice 
The final practice session, sometimes referred to as Happy Hour, was held on Saturday, June 22, after the preliminary NASCAR Featherlite Southwest Series race.

Qualifying 
Qualifying was held on Friday, June 22, at 2:00 PM PST. Drivers would each have one lap to set a lap time. Positions 1-36 would be decided on time, while positions 37-43 would be based on provisionals. Six spots are awarded by the use of provisionals based on owner's points. The seventh is awarded to a past champion who has not otherwise qualified for the race. If no past champ needs the provisional, the next team in the owner points will be awarded a provisional.

Four drivers would fail to qualify: Andy Houston, Kenny Wallace, Anthony Lazzaro, and Jason Leffler.

Full qualifying results

Race results

References 

2001 NASCAR Winston Cup Series
NASCAR races at Sonoma Raceway
June 2001 sports events in the United States
2001 in sports in California